Mustafa Kayabaşı (born 15 March 1988) is a Turkish professional footballer who plays as a midfielder for TFF Third League club 68 Aksaray Belediyespor.

External links

1988 births
People from Erbaa
Living people
Turkish footballers
Association football defenders
Gençlerbirliği S.K. footballers
Fethiyespor footballers
Kastamonuspor footballers
Hacettepe S.K. footballers
Balıkesirspor footballers
Samsunspor footballers
Boluspor footballers
Hatayspor footballers
Ankara Keçiörengücü S.K. footballers
Büyükşehir Belediye Erzurumspor footballers
Orduspor footballers
Ankara Demirspor footballers
İnegölspor footballers
Süper Lig players
TFF First League players
TFF Second League players
TFF Third League players